Selenoprotein N is a protein that in humans is encoded by the SEPN1 gene.

Function 

This gene encodes a selenoprotein, which contains a selenocysteine (Sec) residue at its active site. The selenocysteine is encoded by the UGA codon that normally signals translation termination. The 3' UTR of selenoprotein genes have a common stem-loop structure, the sec insertion sequence (SECIS), that is necessary for the recognition of UGA as a Sec codon rather than as a stop signal. Mutations in this gene cause the classical phenotype of multiminicore disease and congenital muscular dystrophy with spinal rigidity and restrictive respiratory syndrome. Two alternatively spliced transcript variants encoding distinct isoforms have been found for this gene.

Model organisms				

Model organisms have been used in the study of SEPN1 function. A conditional knockout mouse line, called Sepn1tm1a(KOMP)Wtsi was generated as part of the International Knockout Mouse Consortium program — a high-throughput mutagenesis project to generate and distribute animal models of disease to interested scientists.

Male and female animals underwent a standardized phenotypic screen to determine the effects of deletion. Twenty five tests were carried out on homozygous mutant mice and one significant abnormality was observed: than animals displayed vertebral fusion.

References

Further reading

External links 
  GeneReviews/NCBI/NIH/UW entry on Congenital Muscular Dystrophy Overview
 GeneReviews/NCBI/NIH/UW entry on Multiminicore Disease

Selenoproteins
Genes mutated in mice